Acontinae is a subfamily of limbless skinks within the family Scincidae.

Genera
The subfamily Acontinae contains 2 genera.

 Acontias (26 species)
 Typhlosaurus (5 species)

References

 
Reptile subfamilies